is a Japanese women's professional shogi player ranked 3-dan. She is a former holder of the Women's Meijin title.

Early life and amateur shogi
Itō was born in Musashino, Tokyo on October 6, 1993, and learned how to play shogi from her older brother.

As a fifth-grade elementary school student, Itō finished third in the 29th  in April 2004. Itō defeated future shogi professional and major title holder Takuya Nagase in her Round 1 game of the Championship Tournament and won two more games to advance to the semi-finals where she lost to another future shogi professional and eventual tournament winner Yūki Sasaki. Itō was the only girl to qualify for the Championship Tournament, and the field included seven boys who would eventually become professional shogi players, including three who would also become major title holders. In September 2004, Itō was accepted into the Japan Shogi Association's apprentice school at the rank of 6-kyū under the guidance of shogi professional Nobuyuki Yashiki.

Women's professional shogi 
In February 2022, Itō defeated Kana Satomi 3 games to 1 in the 48th Women's Meijin title match (JanuaryFebruary 2022) to capture her first women's major title. In February of the following year, however, she was unable to successfully defend her Meijin title, losing the 49th Women's Meijin title match to Tomoka Nishiyama 3 games to 1.

Promotion history
Ito's promotion history  is as follows.
 1-dan: October 1, 2014
 2-dan: September 11, 2015 
 3-dan: April 26, 2019

Note: All ranks are women's professional ranks.

Major titles
Itō has appeared in a women's professional shogi major title ten times and has won one title.

Awards and honors
Itō received the Japan Shogi Association's Annual Shogi Awards for "Excellent Women's Professional" twice (2017 and 2019), "Most Games Played by a Women's Professional" four times (2017, 2018, 2019 and 2022) and "Women's Professional Game of the Year" once (2022).

Notes

References

External links
 ShogiHub: Ito, Sae

Japanese shogi players
Living people
Women's professional shogi players
People from Musashino, Tokyo
Professional shogi players from Tokyo Metropolis
1993 births
Women's Meijin